Manuel Varet Marte (born July 21, 1979) known professionally as Vakero, is a Dominican rapper, singer, songwriter, and actor. He is one of the most important acts of the Dominican urban music movement and one of the first to gain international exposure. He is known for blending elements of punta, cumbia and merengue, with Dominican Urban and Dembow music. He is heavily influenced by Reggae and Afro pop and his characteristic style influenced by the Rastafari Movement.

Starting his musical career in 1995, he developed a solo career out of his underground success as part of pioneering Dominican Hip Hop duo Perfecto Clan. He is a hard-hitting, witty lyricist whose beats blend American-style rap with tropical sounds. From 2006 to 2008, Vakero was involved in a publicized feud with fellow Dominican rapper Lapiz Conciente, popularized by the diss track "Se Partio El Lapiz", along with his debut album "Pa ke te Mate" which gained international attention. By 2008, he was ranked by Billboard in the Top 5 Rising Latin Urban Act and the track "Se Partio El Lapiz" was used as the soundtrack of one of the episodes of CSI: Miami.

In 2010, he gained international attention for his track "Que Mujer Tan Chula" and the following year becoming the first artist to receive the "Urban Artist of the Year" recipient on the Soberano Awards. In 2014, along with Mozart La Para and Don Miguelo, he became the first Dominican urban artist to headline at The Festival Presidente De La Musica Latina. In 2015, he released his third studio album "Yo", and "Mutuacion" was released in 2017, receiving positive reviews by the media.

Early life 
Vakeró was born on July 21, 1979, in San Pedro de Macoris, notable for breeding Major League Baseball players such as Sammy Sosa, George Bell, Robinson Cano, and Alfonso Soriano among others. His father was a tailor. From an early age he was inclined towards music, and he highlights as an influence the music of the Puerto Rican singer Hector Lavoe. His father's love of music inspired him as a child and Héctor Lavoe, Bob Marley, Fernando Villalona, Ismael Rivera and Marino Pérez became his favorite artists.

Career

1994–2006: Career beginnings 
From an early age, he was inclined towards music. When he was 16 years old he was encouraged to be part of a group called "One Play", together with the rapper Wilking, for about two years. From there he went to another group that leaned towards the rap genre: "Perfecto Clan, La Banda Sonora", an urban band that allowed him to develop his true passion, standing out with a unique style. In 2005, he decided to release his first solo project titled "Adelante y Pico" and his first local hit "Mujer Mala".

2006-2009: Feud with Lapiz and Pa ke te mate 
By 2006, Vakero was an important act of the Dominican Hip Hop Movement. During 2006 to 2008, he was involved in a public feud with fellow Dominican rapper Lapiz Conciente. In 2007, he released the diss track "Se Partio El Lapiz" which gained national airplay. Following that, he released the remix of the track with Arcángel which gained international attention. On October 25, 2007, he released his first studio album "Pa Ke Te Mate" by Jeremy Records. By early 2008, the music videos of  "Se Partio El Lapiz" and "Hasta Mañana Negra Linda" were programmed on mun2 and mtv3.

On February 28, 2008, Vakero signed a distribution deal with Sunflower Entertainment. In September 2008, Billboard ranked him in the Top 5 Hot Rising Latin Urban Act. In the same year, the track "Se Partio El Lapiz" appeared in the soundtrack of an episode of the TV show CSI: Miami, and later on the soundtrack of Chosen Few III: The Movie, becoming the first Hip Hop/Urban Dominican act to receive that level of recognition. On November 18, 2008, he released his second studio album "Manuel: El Cantante de los Raperos" by Jeremy Records and distributed by New York-based Sunflower Entertainment, containing the hit "Te Quiero".

2010-2012 Que Mujer Tan Chula, marriage and Soberano Awards 
In 2010, Vakero released the single "Que Mujer Tan Chula". The track was named the most spined track on the radio and nightclubs in Dominican Republic of 2010 and Vakero the most popular artist. The music video of the track become the first to gain regular rotation on HTV by a Dominican urban artist. He also released the EP Ponte a Trabajar that contained a song with the same title that was featured in the Saints Row: The Third soundtrack. In the same year, he married the American Latin Idol winner Martha Heredia. Following the success of the track he toured New York, Europe and Venezuela.

In 2011, he received the first "Urban Artist/Band of the Year" award on the 27th Annual Soberano Awards, previously named Casandra Awards, the most important music award in Dominican Republic. In the same year, he released the hits "Ay Mami" and the EP "Tu pai", which included the hit with the same name which was featured in the Pro Evolution Soccer 2013 soundtrack. Subsequently he made his debut as an actor with a role on the movie Lotoman, which was the best selling movie of 2011 in the Dominican Republic. In 2012, he was nominated for Urban Artist of the Year at the Casandra Awards.

2013-2022 Legal issues, continued success, Yo and Mutuacion 
On January 17, 2013, Vakero was arrested on charges of domestic violence against his then-wife Martha Heredia. However, on February 21, 2013, she was arrested at the airport trying to transport heroin to New York. Later that year, he was acquitted of the charges. In 2014, he won "Urban Artist of the Year" at the Soberano Awards. In the same year, he found success with the tracks "Hoy se va a Beber", "Los Zapatos" and "Demasiado" which gained national airplay. He performed as a headliner act in the 2014 Festival Presidente De La Musica Latina at the Felix Sanchez Olympic Stadium in Santo Domingo, along with Mozart La Para and Don Miguelo, making history as the first urban acts to perform at the festival. The presentation received positive reviews by local media and had an attendance of over 40,000 fans.

In 2015, Vakero released his third studio album titled Yo which contained the hit "Se te Nota". Following that, he made a quick tour called "Yo! USA Tour" on the east coast of the United States which consisted of about 16 shows. It was his first tour in the United States in four years and it was reported that all concerts were sold out. In 2017, Vakero became the first Dominican urban act to perform at the 2017 South by Southwest Festival in Austin, United States on front of 50,000 fans.

In 2018, he released his fourth studio album titled Mutuacion with strong influences of reggae and afropop. The album received positive reviews by international magazines such as Vibe and Billboard. The music video "Guateque" ranked inside of the HTV Top 21 Hot Ranking. In the same year, his track "El Hombre Gris" was ranked in the Top 11 Songs of Protest & Resistance by Latino Artists. In May 2018, he was the choice to honor the Black History Month as an Afro-Latino artist.

On 27 September 2019 Vakero released his fifth album El Chulo del 23 with influences of reggae and afropop, and which contains his previous 2013 "Echale Agua" and the remix of "Demasiado" hit. In 2020, he released his sixth studio album Cosa Notra with strong influences of hip hop. In the same year, he released his first dembow song "Tu Cojea". The track received positive reviews and ranked in the Top 10 of Dominincan Airplay. In 2021, he received a nomination for Best Music Video for "Varon"; however, he rejected the nomination. In 2022, he was ranked 17th by Kulture Vulutrez in the Top 25 Best Dominican Rappers.

Discography 

 Pa Ke Te Mate (2007)
 El Cantante de los Raperos (2008)
 Yo (2015)
 Mutuacion (2018)
 El Chulo del 23 (2019)
 Cosa Notra (2020)
 Mamá Ika (2022)

References 

Dominican Republic rappers
Dominican Republic male songwriters
1979 births
Living people